Marco Polo is a video messaging and video hosting service mobile app. The app was created in 2014 by Joya Communications. Joya Communications was founded by Vlada Bortnik and Michael Bortnik. The app markets itself as a video walkie talkie, allowing asynchronous video conversations without requiring the recipient(s) to be live.

Notes

Internet properties established in 2014
Android (operating system) software
IOS software
Video software
Social networking services
2014 software
Proprietary cross-platform software